Chewalla is an unincorporated community in McNairy County, Tennessee, United States. Chewalla has a post office with ZIP code 38393.

Chewalla had its start when the railroad was extended to that point. The name Chewalla is derived from a Native American language.

Demographics

References

Unincorporated communities in McNairy County, Tennessee
Unincorporated communities in Tennessee